Albești (until 1924 Ferihaz; ,) is a commune in Mureș County, Transylvania, Romania. It is composed of nine villages: Albești, Bârlibășoaia (Barlabástanya), Boiu (Bún), Jacu (Oláhzsákod), Șapartoc (Sárpatak, "Muddy River"), Țopa (Alsóbún), Valea Albeștiului (Sárpataki út), Valea Dăii (Határpatak), and Valea Șapartocului (Sárpatakivölgy).

The commune lies on the Transylvanian Plateau, on the banks of the river Târnava Mare.

Albești is crossed by national road , which connects Brașov to Sighișoara and Târgu Mureș, the county seat. The Albești train station serves the CFR Line 300 that runs from Bucharest to Cluj-Napoca.

See also
 List of Hungarian exonyms (Mureș County)

Gallery

References

Communes in Mureș County
Localities in Transylvania
Székely communities